Henning Moritzen (3 August 1928 – 11 August 2012) was a Danish film actor. He appeared in more than 70 films between 1950 and 2010. He was born in Taarbæk, Denmark.

Partial filmography

Film 

 John og Irene (1949) – Gæst ved Carlsens selskab (uncredited)
 For frihed og ret (1949) – Ung mand ved Stavnsbåndsjubilæet
 Susanne (1950) – Ung mand
 Vores fjerde far (1951) – Mand på bænk
 Frihed forpligter (1951) – Ung landmand
 Dorte (1951) – Doktor Sørensen
 Kærlighedsdoktoren (1952) – 1. Kontorist
 We Who Go the Kitchen Route (1953) – Dick
 Den gamle mølle på Mols (1953) – Fløgstrup
 Adam og Eva (1953) – Tolder
 This Is Life (1953) – Sanglærer Stefan Korsby
 Himlen er blå (1954) – Slagterens datters kæreste
 Et eventyr om tre (1954) – Kjeld
 Bruden fra Dragstrup (1955) – Walter Brandt
 Kispus (1956) – Jakob
 Tante Tut fra Paris (1956) – Bent Larsen
 Mariannes bryllup (1958) – Jørgen von Hejden
 Mor skal giftes (1958) – Ove Bang
 Poeten og Lillemor (1959) – Poeten
 Poeten og Lillemor og Lotte (1960) – The poet
 Forelsket i København (1960) – Jan Scharf
 Jetpiloter (1961) – Kaptajn Tom Jessen
 Harry og kammertjeneren (1961) – Fyrst Igor
 Poeten og Lillemor i forårshumør (1961) – Poeten
 Eventyr på Mallorca (1961) – Journalist Michael Bolberg
 Crazy Paradise (1962) – Narrator / fortælleren
 Den kære familie (1962) – Alex Maagenhjelm
 Det stod i avisen (1962) – Johan Jespersen
 Venus fra Vestø (1962) – John Morland
 Støvsugerbanden (1963) – Peter Park
 Alt for kvinden (1964) – Grev Ditlev Liljenborg / Grev Peder Joachim Liljenborg
 Don Olsen kommer til byen (1964) – Fortælleren
 Tænk på et tal (1969) – Stines Far
 Stine og drengene (1969) – Flemming Borck
 Cries and Whispers (1972) – Joakim
 Pengene eller livet (1982) – Poul Kristiansen
 Peter von Scholten (1987) – Kong Christian VIII
 Dansen med Regitze (1989) – Borge
 Sofie (1992) – Frederick Philipson
 Roser & persille (1993) – Willy Larsen
 Baby Doom (1998) – Holstein
 Festen (1998) – Faderen – Helge Klingenfeld
 Her i nærheden (2000) – Baronen
 Grev Axel (2001) – Proglog (voice)
 Nu (2002, Short) – Adam (old)
 Visions of Europe (2004) – (segment "Denmark: Europe")
 Strings (2004) – Kahro (voice)
 Allegro (2005) – Tom
 Headhunter (2009) – Niels Frederiks Sieger
 Everything Will Be Fine (2010) – Lemmy Braun

Television 
 Onkel Vanya (1971, TV Movie) – Astrof
 Livsens ondskab (1972) – Fortælleren
 En by i provinsen (1977–1980) – Eriksen, Kriminalinspektør
 SK 917 har nettopp landet (1984) – Purseren
 Tango for tre (1994) – Willy
 Renters rente (1996) – Direktør Nicolaj 'Nic' Holm
 Madsen og Co. (1996) – Ejnar
 Bryggeren (1997) – C. A. Reitzel
 Better Times (2004) – Hr. Stokmand
 Forsvar (2004) – Ewald Bork

References

External links 
 

1928 births
2012 deaths
Best Actor Bodil Award winners
Best Supporting Actor Bodil Award winners
Bodil Honorary Award recipients
Danish male film actors
People from Lyngby-Taarbæk Municipality